I Like It Like That is a 1994 American comedy-drama film about the trials and tribulations of a young Puerto Rican man and a half Jamaican half Puerto Rican American woman living in a poverty-stricken New York City neighborhood in the South Bronx. The film stars Lauren Velez, Jon Seda, Lisa Vidal, Griffin Dunne, Jesse Borrego and Rita Moreno, and was written and directed by Darnell Martin who, in her filmmaking debut, became the first African-American female filmmaker to take helm of a film produced by a major film studio.

The film was screened in the Un Certain Regard section at the 1994 Cannes Film Festival.

Plot
Lisette Linares is a young mother of three children and married to Chino, a bicycle messenger. Although he is always reliable as the breadwinner of the family, Chino is having an affair with their lustful neighbor, Magdalena. One summer evening, as a blackout sweeps the neighborhood, Chino gets arrested for looting.

Now faced with the reality of keeping her family together while the main breadwinner is in jail, Lisette, encouraged by her transgender sister Alexis, decides to give her dream of becoming a print model a chance. As she happens to be in the right place at the right time, Lisette lands a job as the personal assistant to a major record label producer, Stephen Price, who is trying to sign a major Latin music group (played by the real-life group the Barrio Boyzz). Chino is then released from prison by Magdalena and her father. She then claims Chino fathered her son, Ritchie. Lisette hits rock bottom as a result of this and moves in with Alexis. At her new job, while having sex with Price, he answers a number of phone calls, frustrating Lisette. The next day, Chino tries to go back to his job, but he is fired due to his criminal record. Lisette then confronts Chino to prove that she had sex with another man to get even with him.

While Chino is taking the kids out for ice cream, his extremely rebellious son, Li'l Chino, asks if he could buy ice cream, but Chino tells him that he needs to work in order to buy things. His son then shows him money so Chino allows him to buy the ice cream; when Minnie, his younger daughter, notices that he is wearing new sneakers and pants, Chino realizes that his son has become a drug dealer. Chino furiously lashes out at his son, pushing him towards a mural with a picture of his uncle Hector (Chino's brother) on it, who was a police officer killed by a drug dealer. He whips his son in front of the whole block while his son's friends laugh at him. Alexis notices the commotion and tries to stop him.

Alexis then points out that his son is just a little boy and pulls him away, but Li'l Chino runs away. The kids are still laughing and continue to insult Lil' Chino as weak. An infuriated Chino then beats a kid from the crowd and whips him. The drug dealer attempts to draw a gun, but Chino manages to disarm him, while fellow neighbors help Chino whip the boy. Li'l Chino is then found sitting in front of Alexis' apartment door. He tells Lisette that he wants to stay with her, but she rejects him, believing that he will still be disrespectful toward her. Chino then finds Li'l Chino and takes him home. Back at the apartment, Chino and his friend Angel put his and Lisette's youngest son, Pee-Wee, to bed. When Angel reveals that he is Ritchie's actual father, Chino is angered that Magdalena has played him the whole time. Alexis and Lisette have a discussion about the kids, where Alexis points out that Lisette is just like their own estranged mother. She denies this and Alexis changes and leaves to visit their mother.

When Alexis arrives over there, her mother opens the door and reacts disgustedly to Alexis' appearance. Alexis tries her hardest to make amends with her mother; when her father comes out of his room to check on the noise, he reacts with an aggressive look on his face. Back at Alexis' apartment, Lisette hears the door open and notices that Alexis has returned. When Lisette comes to check on Alexis, she notices her face is injured and asks what happened, but Alexis tells her that she was right about their mother still being unsupportive of Alexis' transgender identity.

The next day at work, Price wants to have sex again, but she tries to reject him. He stops when Lisette tells him he's "not a sexual person", and the two begin to argue, which results in her nearly quitting. They resolve to continue their working relationship. Lisette arrives back at the apartment. She tries to talk to her children and asks for their forgiveness, mostly from Li'l Chino, which he does finally give. Chino arrives later from his new job as a security officer. Both discuss the many flaws in their marriage, hash their infidelities out, and Chino finally tells Lisette the truth about Magdalena's baby daddy. The scene ends with Lisette pointing out to Chino that he never thinks about "the other person", to which he then replies, "Good night, other person", despite that it is morning already. Lisette lies on the sofa with a smile on her face.

Cast

Reception
On Rotten Tomatoes the film has an approval rating of 88% based on 67 reviews. The site’s critics consensus states, "A richly textured romantic comedy, I Like It Like That draws on a smart script and spirited performances to tell a refreshingly original story."

Roger Ebert gave the film 3 out of 4 stars and said of the film: "I Like It Like That looks more unconventional than it is, but Martin puts a spin on the material with lots of human color and high energy."

Year-end lists 
 9th – Bob Strauss, Los Angeles Daily News
 10th – Steve Persall, St. Petersburg Times
 Top 10 runner-ups (not ranked) – Janet Maslin, The New York Times
 "The second 10" (not ranked) – Sean P. Means, The Salt Lake Tribune
 Top 18 worst (alphabetically listed, not ranked) – Michael Mills, The Palm Beach Post

References

External links
 

1994 films
1994 LGBT-related films
American LGBT-related films
LGBT-related comedy-drama films
American independent films
1994 independent films
American comedy-drama films
Films directed by Darnell Martin
Films set in the Bronx
Films about trans women
Columbia Pictures films
1994 directorial debut films
1990s English-language films
1990s American films